"Walls (Circus)" is a song written by Tom Petty and recorded by Tom Petty and the Heartbreakers. It was released in July 1996 as the first single from their soundtrack album Songs and Music from "She's the One". The song features Lindsey Buckingham on background vocals. The song peaked at number 69 on the U.S. Billboard Hot 100 chart. The song was recorded at Sound City Studios by engineer Sylvia Massy. An alternate arrangement of the song, played at a faster tempo, was included on the soundtrack under the title "Walls (No. 3)". The song was later covered by Glen Campbell on his 2008 album Meet Glen Campbell and by The Lumineers on the first anniversary of Petty's death.

Music video
Maxine Bahns, Edward Burns and Jennifer Aniston appeared in the video. The music video was directed by Phil Joanou and was premiered in July 1996.

Charts

Weekly charts

Year-end charts

"Walls (No. 3)"

Track 12 on the album is a faster, more mellow version titled "Walls (No. 3)". It has the same lyrics and melody, but the intro is different and the song in general has less emphasis on the instruments.

References

1996 singles
Tom Petty songs
Songs written by Tom Petty
1996 songs
Song recordings produced by Rick Rubin
Warner Records singles
Music videos directed by Phil Joanou